Philonome clemensella is a species of moth of the  family Tineidae found in North America.

Description
The length of the forewings is 2.8–4.4 mm. The wings are narrow and typically folded around the abdomen at rest. The forewing has an orange-brown ground color. A diagonal, white median line stops short of the costa and turns parallel to the costa to meet the white thorax. A diagonal, white postmedial line begins wide at the costa and narrows and stops before reaching the curved outer margin. Black scales appear in several small clumps: posterior to the thorax, in a tuft near the median line, at the inner end of the postmedial line, and along the outer margin.

Taxonomy
The species has been classified in the leaf-miner moth family Lyonetiidae in the past. A genetics study published in 2013 showed that the species belongs in the family Tineidae of clothes moths.

Range
The species' occurrence range extends from Oklahoma and Minnesota in the west to Florida and Maine in the east, including southeastern Canada.

Life cycle
Previous accounts have reported that P. clemensella have been collected from hickory and linden trees, however recent review indicates: "these were based on the ambiguous label data of specimens from the United States National Museum of Natural History. No additional observation of the larvae of P. clemensella has been reported from these trees." Adults have been reported from April to November, with most sightings in June and July.

References

Moths described in 1874
Tineidae